Square Peg or Pegs may refer to:

Square Pegs, a 1982-1983 American TV series starring Sarah Jessica Parker
"Square Pegs" (song), from The Waitresses' 1982 album I Could Rule the World If I Could Only Get the Parts, used as the TV show's theme song
Square Pegs (Hong Kong TV series), a 2003 Hong Kong TV series
Square peg in a round hole, an idiomatic expression
The Square Peg, a 1959 British war comedy film starring Norman Wisdom
"Square Peg" (King of the Hill), episode of King of the Hill
Square Peg (company), an American film and television production company